Eva Moberg may refer to:
 Eva Moberg (orienteer), Swedish orienteering competitor
 Eva Moberg (writer) (1932–2011), Swedish feminist and writer